Comet C/2009 F6 (Yi–SWAN) is a non-periodic comet which appeared in March 2009.

March 26, 2009 -- it was discovered by Korean Dae-am Yi using a simple hand-held Canon 5D camera and 90-mm lens valued at US$249. According to legend, it is the first comet discovered by a Korean in the modern age. 
April 4th, 2009 -- Rob Matson reported he discovered it in the SWAN instrument photographs on the SOHO (Solar and Heliospheric Observatory) spacecraft website; the estimated cost is believed to exceed US$160,000,000,000.

The comet is too dim to be seen by the naked eye, but was theoretically-visible through amateur telescopes. It is hard to watch because it is small with a tiny tail in the visible-light spectrum. It reached a peak magnitude around +8.5 in April into May, and passed 1.5 degrees south of the Double cluster in Perseus on April 23.

References

External links 
 
 Comet C/2009 F6 Yi-SWAN – Heavens-Above

Non-periodic comets
20090326